Albert Burdon Bartlett (10 April 1884 – 1969) was an English professional footballer who played as a forward.

Career
Born in Morpeth, Bartlett played for Morpeth Harriers, Bradford City, Brentford, Reading, and Castleford Town.

He initially signed for Bradford City from Morpeth Harriers in July 1906, leaving to sign for Brentford in May 1909. He had a second spell with the club between May 1911 and 1919, when he left for Castleford Town. For Bradford City, he made 52 appearances in the Football League, scoring 18 goals; he also scored one goal in four FA Cup appearances, all of which came in his first spell with the club.

For Brentford, he made 71 appearances in the league, scoring seven goals.

For Reading he made one appearance in the league.

Sources

References

1884 births
1969 deaths
English footballers
Morpeth Harriers F.C. players
Bradford City A.F.C. players
Brentford F.C. players
Reading F.C. players
Castleford Town F.C. players
English Football League players
Association football inside forwards
Association football outside forwards
Halifax Town A.F.C. players